Niek Kemps (born 1952, in Nijmegen) is a Dutch visual artist and lives and works in Amsterdam and Wenduine, Belgium.

Museums
Work of Niek Kemps is represented in the collection of the following museums:
 Stedelijk Van Abbemuseum in Eindhoven
 Stedelijk Museum in Amsterdam
 Museum Boijmans Van Beuningen in Rotterdam
 Rijksmuseum Kröller-Müller in Otterlo
 Stedelijk Museum in Roermond
 Museum van Hedendaagse Kunst (Muhka) in Antwerp, Belgium
 Stedelijk Museum voor Actuele Kunst (SMAK) in Ghent, Belgium

Exhibitions (selection)
 'The 80's: A Topology', Museo Serralves, Porto, Portugal (2006)
 'Nederland niet Nederland', Van Abbemuseum, Eindhoven (2004)
 Münsterland Sculpture Biennal, Münsterland (2003)
 'Ville, le Jardin, la Mémoire', Villa de Medici, Rome, Italy (2000)
 'L'Ombra degli dei', Mito Greco e arte contemporanea, Palermo, Italy (1998)
 'Big eyes, small window', Tramway, Glasgow (1996)
 'Loosely Coupled System', Foksal Galleria, Warschau (1996)
 The Corcoran Museum of Art, Washington D.C. (1995)
 Biennal of Venice, Italy (1993)
 World Expo in Sevilla, Spain (1992)
 'Opac', Caixa de Pensions, Barcelona, Spain (1991)
 'TweeTwoDeux', Musee d'Art Moderne, Saint-Étienne, France (1988)
 'TweeTwoDeux', Museum Boijmans Van Beuningen, Rotterdam (1988)
 Documenta 8, Kassel, Germany (1987)
 'Chambres d'amis', Stedelijk Museum voor Actuele Kunst (SMAK) in Ghent, Belgium (1986)
 Sonsbeek '86, International Sculpture Show, Arnhem (1986)
 'Don't forget it', Stedelijk Museum voor Actuele Kunst (SMAK) in Ghent, Belgium (1984)
 'Groene Wouden', Rijksmuseum Kröller-Müller, Otterlo (1983)

Public space
 Nationaal Dachau Monument in the Amsterdamse Bos
 Rijksmonument Het Sieraad in Amsterdam
 Ruitenstraat in Dordrecht

Corporate collections
 Schiphol Airport
 Achmea Kunstcollectie
 Kunstcollectie KPN
 TNT Post Kunstcollectie
 Academisch Ziekenhuis Maastricht
 Ministerie van Verkeer en Waterstaat, Maastricht

See also
Lijst van Nederlandse beeldhouwers

External links
 Website Niek Kemps
 Ons Erfdeel (1998)
 BNET Business Network (1996)
 Achmea Kunstcollectie
 Nationaal Dachau Monument
 Rijksmonument Het Sieraad

Living people
People from Nijmegen
1952 births
Dutch contemporary artists